Breach 3 is a 1995 real-time tactics video game developed by Impressions Games and published by Sierra On-Line. It is the sequel to Breach and Breach 2.

Gameplay
Breach 3 is a real-time tactics game, in which the player navigates an armed squad through discrete missions. It follows a pausable real-time structure, and has been compared to titles such as Jagged Alliance and UFO: Enemy Unknown.

Reception

Writing for PC Entertainment, Christopher Lindquist argued, "Breach 3s big problem is that the merc-gaming world has become much richer in the past couple of years, but Breach has not." Computer Game Review concurred that the game was out of date: the magazine concluded that Breach 3 "would've been awesome if it had been released on schedule." T. Liam McDonald of PC Gamer US was more positive. Although he agreed that "not enough has been done" to update the series to then-current standards, he found Breach 3 "an entertaining return to the days when this was groundbreaking gameplay."

References

External links

1995 video games
DOS games
DOS-only games
Impressions Games games
Role-playing video games
Science fiction video games
Sierra Entertainment games
Single-player video games
Strategy video games
Tactical role-playing video games
Real-time tactics video games
Video games developed in the United States